Tauba Tera Jalwa  is an upcoming Indian Hindi language film directed by Akashaditya Lama, starring Jatin Khurana, Ameesha Patel, and 'Angela Krislinzki and Rajesh Sharma.

Cast
 Jatin Khurana as Romy Tyagi
 Ameesha Patel as Laila
 Angela Krislinzki as Rinku 
 Anil Rastogi as Bharat Singh

References

External links

Upcoming films
Hindi-language drama films
Indian drama films